Rafael Moreno may refer to:

 Pichichi (footballer) (Rafael Moreno Aranzadi, 1892–1922), Spanish footballer
 Rafael Moreno Valle (1917–2016), Mexican military physician and politician
 Rafael Moreno Valle Rosas (1968–2018), Mexican politician
 Rafael Moreno (baseball) (born 1995), Brazilian baseball pitcher
 Rafael Moreno (tennis) (born 1960), Dominican Republic tennis player
 Rafael Moreno Rojas, Chilean politician
 Rafael Moreno (judoka) (born 1966), Spanish judoka